The Museo archeologico e d'arte della Maremma (Archaeological and Art Museum of Maremma) is an archaeological and art museum in Grosseto, Tuscany, Italy.

In 1955 the museum became a separated institution with the name of Museo civico archeologico di Grosseto, under the direction of archaeologist Aldo Mazzolai. It was completely renewed in 1975 and set up in the former courthouse in Piazza Baccarini; it was then renamed Museo archeologico e d'arte della Maremma.

Bibliography

External links

1860 establishments
Archaeological museums in Italy
Art museums and galleries in Tuscany
Museums in Grosseto